An election for the leadership of the New South Wales branch of the Australian Labor Party was held between 7 and 29 June 2019. The election was triggered by the resignation of Leader Michael Daley on 25 March 2019. The election was a combined vote by the party membership and the Labor members of the Parliament of New South Wales, with each component weighted equally. The party members were sent their ballots on 7 June and had until 21 June to return them, while the parliamentary caucus met on 29 June to cast their votes.

On 29 June, Jodi McKay was announced as the victor of the contest, winning 60.5% of the combined vote.

Background
Following Labor's loss in the 2019 state election, then-leader Michael Daley resigned under pressure from the party caucus after initially declaring he would remain as head of the party and leader of the opposition. This triggered a leadership election to be held at an undetermined future date. Daley initially declared his intention to nominate for the leadership in the election, but on 26 March walked back on this statement. The contest was scheduled for after the 2019 federal election to avoid conflicting with Labor's federal campaign. Deputy leader Penny Sharpe served as interim leader after Daley's resignation.

Campaign
On 23 May, Chris Minns announced he would contest the leadership. The following day, Jodi McKay announced she would also contest the leadership.

A leadership debate was held on 3 June between the two candidates.
Minns emphasised the need for party renewal and rejuvenating Labor's image. Referring to Labor's losses in both the recent state and federal elections, he stated: "I am firmly of the belief that now is not the time for us to crawl up in a ball and for the Labor party not to believe in things. We are at our best when we believe in things. We are at our best when we stand for principles and fight for that." He said that his focus would be on liveable cities, privatisation, and climate change. He promised to better explain to voters that action on climate change was a necessary measure to protect both the state's environmental assets and its economy. He also emphasised a need to embrace immigrant communities, and make it clear that blame for the difficulties of overpopulation did not fall on immigration.
McKay agreed that Labor's losses prompted a need for self-reflection within the party, and that new leadership presented opportunities for change. She stated that she had "[thought] about my values and the values that I bring to the Labor Party." She promised to prioritise homelessness, mental health, and education, seeking to increase teacher salaries and reduce class sizes. She said: "I want us to talk about the difficult issues; they're not popular but they're issues that demand a Labor Party response."

Candidates

Nominated
Chris Minns, Shadow Minister for Water - announced 23 May 2019

Jodi McKay, Shadow Minister for Transport and Shadow Minister for Roads, Maritime and Freight - announced 24 May 2019

Withdrew
Michael Daley, Leader of the Opposition (2018–2019) (endorsed Jodi McKay)

Declined
Penny Sharpe, Interim Leader (2019−present) and Deputy Leader (2018−2019)
Ryan Park, Shadow Treasurer
Kate Washington, Shadow Minister for Early Childhood Education and Shadow Minister for the Hunter (endorsed Jodi McKay)

Results

Caucus Votes
Votes in favour of Jodi McKay:
Jodi McKay
Jenny Aitchison
Stephen Ball
Clayton Barr
Mark Buttigieg
Prue Carr
Yasmin Catley
Sophie Cotsis
Tim Crakanthorp
Anthony D'Adam
Michael Daley
Trish Doyle
Julia Finn
John Graham
David Harris
Jodi Harrison
Paul Lynch
Hugh McDermott
Tara Moriarty
Marjorie O'Neill
Ryan Park
Peter Primrose
Adam Searle
Leisl Tesch
Mick Veitch
Lynda Voltz
Greg Warren
Kate Washington
Anna Watson

Votes in favour of Chris Minns
Chris Minns
Edmund Atalla
Anoulack Chanthivong
Jihad Dib
Jo Haylen
Greg Donnelly
Ron Hoenig
Courtney Houssos
Sonia Hornery
Rose Jackson
Steve Kamper
Nick Lalich
David Mehan
Tania Milhailuk
Daniel Mookhey
Shaoquett Moselmane
Janelle Safin
Paul Scully
Penny Sharpe
Walt Secord
Guy Zangari

See also

2015 New South Wales state election
2019 New South Wales state election
Australian Labor Party leadership spill, September 2013
2015 Australian Labor Party (New South Wales Branch) leadership election
2018 Australian Labor Party (New South Wales Branch) leadership election
2018 Liberal Party of Australia leadership spills

References

2019 elections in Australia
Australian Labor Party leadership spills
June 2019 events in Australia
Australian Labor Party (New South Wales Branch) leadership election